To the Slaughter is a BBC Books original novel written by Stephen Cole and based on the long-running British science fiction television series Doctor Who. It features the Eighth Doctor, Fitz and Trix.

Continuity
The novel provides an explanation as to why Jupiter had only twelve moons at the time of the Fourth Doctor serial Revenge of the Cybermen when, at last count, the planet has sixty-three moons. In Cole's author's note, he states that his inspiration for the book was to explain away the discrepancy.
The Doctor still cannot see the colour violet, an ability he lost in Unnatural History.

External links

The Cloister Library - To the Slaughter

2005 British novels
2005 science fiction novels
Eighth Doctor Adventures
Novels by Stephen Cole